The 1934 Louisville Cardinals football team was an American football team that represented the University of Louisville as a member of the Southern Intercollegiate Athletic Association (SIAA) during the 1934 college football season. In their second season under head coach Ben Cregor, the Cardinals compiled a 2–5 record.

Schedule

References

Louisville
Louisville Cardinals football seasons
Louisville Cardinals football